Galton W. Young, better known as Skip Young and Sweet Brown Sugar (July 24, 1951 – December 3, 2010) was an American professional wrestler who competed on the Southeastern regional promotions during the late 1970s and throughout the 1980s in Florida Championship Wrestling, World Class Championship Wrestling and the National Wrestling Alliance.

Professional wrestling career 
After making his debut in Florida Championship Wrestling, Skip Young originally wrestled as the masked "Sweet Brown Sugar" winning the NWA Florida Southern Heavyweight Championship three times between 1979 and 1982. He also formed a successful tag team with Butch Reed in the Florida region winning the NWA North American Tag Team titles in April 1982.

During the early 1980s, he also toured Japan most notably facing Genichiro Tenryu and Ashura Hara in a tag team match with The Destroyer in Tokyo, Japan on January 3, 1982.

Skip Young had a couple of runs in Puerto Rico with the World Wrestling Council, he went to the ring wearing a hat of a Puerto Rican flag. On many interviews Skip Young said he loved the Puerto Rican culture.

After leaving the Florida region in 1984, Young began wrestling unmasked in the Texas-area where he began teaming with "Pistol" Pez Whatley and feuded with the PYT Express although he would later win the WCWA Tag Team titles with "Mr. USA" Tony Atlas in 1987.

Young retired from wrestling in 1997.

Death 
Young died on December 3, 2010 at 59.

Championships and accomplishments 

Championship Wrestling from Florida
NWA Florida Bahamian Championship (1 time)
NWA Florida Television Championship (1 time)
NWA North American Tag Team Championship (Florida version) (1 time) - with Butch Reed
NWA Southern Heavyweight Championship (Florida version) (3 times)

Pro Wrestling Illustrated
PWI ranked him #252 of the 500 best singles wrestlers in the PWI 500 in 1991
PWI Rookie of the Year (1979)

World Class Championship Wrestling / World Class Wrestling Association
NWA Texas Tag Team Championship (1 time) - with Kerry Von Erich (1)
WCWA Texas Tag Team Championship (1 time) - with Tony Atlas

World Wrestling Council
WWC Television Championship (1 time)

References

External links 
 OklaFan.com - Skip Young
 KayfabeMemories.com - Regional Territories: World Class Championship Wrestling
 

1951 births
2010 deaths
20th-century African-American sportspeople
21st-century African-American people
American male professional wrestlers
African-American male professional wrestlers
Masked wrestlers
People from Houston
Professional wrestlers from Texas
WWC Television Champions
NWA Florida Tag Team Champions
NWA Florida Television Champions
NWA Florida Bahamian Champions
NWA Southern Heavyweight Champions (Florida version)
NWA Americas Heavyweight Champions